Frank Edis Singleton (August 29, 1887 – August 11, 1935) was an American college football coach. He was the head football coach at Louisiana Tech University, then known as Louisiana Industrial Institute, in 1902, compiling a record of 1-1-1.

Head coaching record

References

External links
 

1887 births
1935 deaths
Louisiana Tech Bulldogs football coaches
Coaches of American football from Mississippi